Operation Coronado IV was the fourth of the Operation Coronado series of riverine military operations conducted by the U.S. Mobile Riverine Force (MRF), designed to shut down Viet Cong (VC) strongholds in the Mekong Delta. It ran from 19 August to 9 September 1967. It took place in Long An, Gò Công and Kiến Hòa Provinces (now Long An, Tien Giang and Bến Tre Provinces).

Operation 
On 20 August the MRF assault craft left the Soài Rạp and Vàm Cỏ river anchorage of the MRF's main base just after midnight and landed their troops at 09:04 in the target area north of Bến Lức on the Vàm Cỏ Dong (Vam Co East) River, after travelling more than 50km. Because the waterways off the Vàm Cỏ Dong in the target area were not navigable by the vessels, the two infantry battalions were landed to move west and search the area on foot. Company C, 3rd Battalion, 47th Infantry Regiment remained at a pickup zone near the fire support base at Bến Lức as an airmobile reserve. To intercept VC forces, the 334th Aviation Company's supporting gunships maintained surveillance of the areas forward of the infantry battalions.

At 14:00 the movement of the 3/47th Infantry forced a VC platoon to retreat from a lightly fortified area. The gunships were then ordered by the battalion commander to open fire on VC attempting to evade contact with the ground troops, and the 3/47th Infantry, was brought in by helicopter to attack the VC, encountering mostly sniper fire and collateral damage from US helicopter fire. The Americans found 34 VC dead and documents that identified them as part of the 506th Local Force Battalion.

The Americans believed they had succeeded because of the surprise achieved by the ground troops in disembarking from the boats landing from the river, forcing the VC into open terrain where helicopters could attack them. During the phase of the operation at Ben Luc, which ended on 22 August, the MRF suffered six wounded and the VC 59 dead.

For the remainder of August and the first week of September, the MRF operated in Cần Giuộc District, encountering minor communist resistance. On 7 and 8 September the force operated in conjunction with the 1st Brigade, 9th Infantry Division, in the southeastern part of Nhơn Trạch District of Biên Hòa Province and the northeastern part of the Rung Sat Special Zone. They did not encounter many VC but a cache containing medical supplies, eight crew-served weapons, and 97 small arms was discovered. As the second week of September began, the force prepared to return to Định Tường Province in IV Corps further south.

See also
 Operation Coronado
 Operation Coronado II
 Operation Coronado V
 Operation Coronado IX
 Operation Coronado XI

References

1967 in Vietnam
Battles and operations of the Vietnam War
Riverine warfare
Battles and operations of the Vietnam War in 1967
History of Bến Tre Province
History of Long An Province
History of Tiền Giang Province